Brachycaulos simplicifolius is a species of flowering plant in the rose family, Rosaceae. It is endemic to the Himalayas. The genus and species were first formally named in 1981 by B.K. Dikshit and Gopinath Panigrahi. It is the only species in the genus Brachycaulos.

References

Rosoideae
Flora of India (region)
Monotypic Rosaceae genera